Plaça d'Espanya, also simply known as Espanya, is an interchange complex underneath Plaça d'Espanya, in the Barcelona district of Sants-Montjuïc, in Catalonia, Spain. It comprises the Barcelona terminus of the Llobregat–Anoia Line and a Barcelona Metro station complex served by lines 1 (L1) and 3 (L3). On the L1, the station is between Hostafrancs and Rocafort, and on the L3 it is between Poble Sec and Tarragona. The Llobregat–Anoia Line station is served by Barcelona Metro line 8 (L8), Baix Llobregat Metro lines S33, S4 and S8, and commuter rail lines R5, R6, R50 and R60. The services on the Llobregat–Anoia Line (including the L8) are operated by Ferrocarrils de la Generalitat de Catalunya (FGC), whilst the L1 and L3 are operated by Transports Metropolitans de Barcelona (TMB).

History
The station opened in 1926, when both the metro line L1 platforms, on the initial section of L1 between Bordeta and Catalunya stations, and the upper level FGC platforms opened. In 1929 the station served the 1929 Barcelona International Exposition held nearby.

The metro line L3 platforms were added in 1975, on the then separate line L3b between Paral·lel and Sants stations. The platforms became served by the L3 proper in 1982, when the L3 and L3b were merged into a single through service.

In 1997, two lower-level platforms were added to the FGC part of the station, aligned in anticipation of future eastern extension of the FGC lines.

Station layout
The station complex comprises three sets of platforms, serving three different sets of lines on three different track gauges. All three sets of platforms are connected by pedestrian subways to each other, and to various street entrances in the square and its surrounding streets. The sets of platforms are:

 The Llobregat–Anoia Line uses four metre gauge terminal tracks located under Gran Via de les Corts Catalanes at its intersection with Plaça Espanya. The four tracks are at two different levels. The tracks on the upper level are served by a pair of  side platforms, whilst the tracks on the lower level are served by an island platform. The four terminal tracks converge, west of the station, into a single pair of tracks carrying all train services.
 Barcelona Metro line 1 (L1) uses a pair of through Iberian gauge tracks located directly below Plaça Espanya. These tracks are served by a pair of  side platforms. Previously, there had existed a third terminal track and platform, allowing trains from the city center to terminate at the station.
 Barcelona Metro line 3 (L3) uses a pair of through standard gauge tracks located beneath Paral·lel Avenue, between Plaça Espanya and Carrer Llançà. These tracks are served by a pair of  side platforms.

Accesses
The interchange station has the following entrances:

 Carrer de Tarragona
 Avinguda Paral·lel
 Exposició (located in front of Fira de Barcelona's trade fair venue in Plaça d'Espanya)
 FGC  (located in the southwestern side of Plaça d'Espanya)
 Carrer de la Creu Coberta

Photo gallery

Notes

References

External links
 
 The Barcelona Metro stations (L1 and L3) listing at the Transports Metropolitans de Barcelona (TMB) website
 Information and photos of the Llobregat–Anoia Line and Barcelona Metro (L1 and L3) stations at trenscat.cat 
 Videos on train operations at the Llobregat–Anoia Line and Barcelona Metro (L1 and L3) stations on YouTube

Barcelona Metro line 1 stations
Barcelona Metro line 3 stations
Barcelona Metro line 8 stations
Stations on the Llobregat–Anoia Line
Railway stations in Spain opened in 1926
Railway stations in Spain opened in 1975
Transport in Sants-Montjuïc
Railway stations located underground in Spain